Mount Hoffman is a distinctive rock peak  south-southwest of Mount Tidd, in the southern flank of the Pirrit Hills of Antarctica. The peak was positioned by the U.S. Ellsworth–Byrd Traverse Party on December 7, 1958, and was named for Daniel Hoffman, a mechanic with the traverse party.

See also
 Mountains in Antarctica

References

Mountains of Ellsworth Land